Hardin is a city in and the county seat of Big Horn County, Montana, United States. The population was 3,818 at the 2020 census.

It is located just north of the Crow Indian Reservation.

History
The city was named for Samuel Hardin, a friend of developer Charles Henry Morrill. It was incorporated in 1911. Thomas D. Campbell operated the nation's largest wheat farm on 95,000 acres near here and pioneered the use of industrial machinery in farming. The Holly Sugar Company established a sugar beet–processing plant in Hardin in 1937.

Geography
Hardin is located at  (45.731824, -107.612542).

The Little Bighorn River empties into the Bighorn River near the town.

Economy
Hardin hosts a bitcoin mining facility by Marathon Patent Group, according to a press release by the company.

Demographics

2010 census
As of the census of 2010, there were 3,505 people, 1,301 households, and 850 families living in the city. The racial makeup of the city was 49.8% White, 0.7% African American, 40.8% Native American, 1.2% Asian, 0.1% Pacific Islander, 2.2% from other races, and 5.1% from two or more races. Hispanic or Latino of any race were 7.1% of the population.

There were 1,301 households, of which 37.2% had children under the age of 18 living with them, 43.4% were married couples living together, 15.4% had a female householder with no husband present, 6.5% had a male householder with no wife present, and 34.7% were non-families. 30.7% of all households were made up of individuals, and 14.4% had someone living alone who was 65 years of age or older. The average household size was 2.64 and the average family size was 3.29.

The median age in the city was 33.2 years. 29.7% of residents were under the age of 18; 10.1% were between the ages of 18 and 24; 22.1% were from 25 to 44; 24.7% were from 45 to 64; and 13.3% were 65 years of age or older. The gender makeup of the city was 48.7% male and 51.3% female.

2000 census
As of the census of 2000, there were 3,384 people, 1,295 households, and 868 families living in the city. The population density was 2,415.5 people per square mile (933.3/km2). There were 1,411 housing units at an average density of 1,007.2 per square mile (389.1/km2). The racial makeup of the city was 62.26% White, 0.12% African American, 31.59% Native American, 0.35% Asian, 1.03% from other races, and 4.64% from two or more races. Hispanic or Latino of any race were 5.53% of the population.

There were 1,295 households, out of which 36.2% had children under the age of 18 living with them, 46.3% were married couples living together, 16.6% had a female householder with no husband present, and 32.9% were non-families. 29.2% of all households were made up of individuals, and 12.7% had someone living alone who was 65 years of age or older. The average household size was 2.55 and the average family size was 3.16.

In the city, the population was spread out, with 31.0% under the age of 18, 7.7% from 18 to 24, 26.3% from 25 to 44, 21.1% from 45 to 64, and 13.9% who were 65 years of age or older. The median age was 34 years. For every 100 females there were 88.8 males. For every 100 females age 18 and over, there were 79.6 males.

The median income for a household in the city was $28,018, and the median income for a family was $33,729. Males had a median income of $28,493 versus $19,444 for females. The per capita income for the city was $13,041. About 17.2% of families and 23.9% of the population were below the poverty line, including 33.1% of those under age 18 and 13.1% of those age 65 or over.

Events
The Hardin Area Chamber of Commerce and Agriculture conducts the annual Little Big Horn Days festival in the 3rd weekend in June, including the Custer's Last Stand Reenactment.

Jail

In 2004–05, a consortium including architectural, bond sellers and contractors located in Texas, promoting the construction of speculative prison and jail ventures  convinced Hardin's industrial development authority to float a $27 million bond issuance to build the  Two Rivers Detention Facility. It was designed for 464 inmates, and was to be located on a  sugar beet field. The facility was slated to open in July 2007 but the state of Montana would not approve it. The Authority bonds defaulted on May 1, 2008. The consortium's contract terminated in January 2009 without any prisoners ever being housed in the jail.

In November 2009 the Two Rivers Board hired its fifth director. A reserve fund of $814,000 was earmarked to maintain the building for possible future use. It remained complete and vacant for over seven years, though it was partially filled for 18 months. By February 2016, empty once again, it had cost the city $582,595 paid to Two Rivers to maintain it since 2004. Due to unpaid interest on the defaulted bonds, its estimated indebtedness had increased to over $40 million by December 2015.

Climate

According to the Köppen Climate Classification system, Hardin has a cold semi-arid climate, abbreviated "BSk" on climate maps.

Infrastructure
Big Horn County Airport is a public use airport located 3 miles west of town.

Education
Hardin Public Schools serves students from kindergarten to 12th grade. Hardin High School's team name is the Bulldogs.

The Big Horn County Library operates in Hardin.

Notable people
 Kroy Biermann - NFL defensive end
 Kendall Cross - Olympic Gold Medalist in Freestyle Wrestling
 Tim Fox - Attorney General of Montana

Media

Radio
 KHDN 1230 (Talk) (silent)
 KRWS-LP 100.7 (Oldies)

Newspapers
 Big Horn County News
 The Original Briefs

References

County seats in Montana
Cities in Big Horn County, Montana
Cities in Montana